The Ridge is a historic home located at Derwood, Montgomery County, Maryland, United States. It is a -story Flemish bond brick house on a fieldstone foundation.  The decorative detailing in the main house reflects Georgian, Federal, and Greek Revival influences. Also on the property is an 18th-century two-story log building. It was the home of Zadok Magruder and his descendants, until 1956.

The Ridge was listed on the National Register of Historic Places in 1988.

References

External links
, including photo in 2004, at Maryland Historical Trust website
The Ridge, Redland vicinity, Montgomery, MD at the Historic American Buildings Survey (HABS)

Derwood, Maryland
Houses on the National Register of Historic Places in Maryland
Houses in Montgomery County, Maryland
Georgian architecture in Maryland
Federal architecture in Maryland
Greek Revival houses in Maryland
Historic American Buildings Survey in Maryland
National Register of Historic Places in Montgomery County, Maryland